Yaël Liesdek (born 21 October 2001) is a Dutch professional footballer who plays as a defender for SC Telstar.

References

2001 births
Living people
Dutch footballers
Footballers from Amsterdam
Association football defenders
SC Telstar players
Eerste Divisie players
Association football players not categorized by nationality